The coho salmon is a species of salmon.

Coho or COHO may also refer to:
 COHO, a radar technique
 MV Coho, a car ferry built in 1959 and operated by Black Ball Lines between Victoria, British Columbia and Port Angeles, Washington
 Coho, code name for Linspire 4.5, a Linux distribution

See also 
 Jeffrey Coho, a fictional character in the Boston Legal TV series
 Koho (disambiguation)